The Inter-Services Intelligence (ISI), intelligence agency of Pakistan has been involved in running military intelligence programs in India, with one of the subsections of its Joint Intelligence Bureau (JIB) department devoted to perform various operations in India. The Joint Signal Intelligence Bureau (JSIB) department has also been involved in providing communications support to Pakistani agents operating in Indian-administered Kashmir. The Joint Intelligence North section of the Joint Counter-Intelligence Bureau (JCIB) wing deals particularly with India. In the 1950s the ISI's Covert Action Division was alleged for supplied arms to insurgents in Northeast India.
 
India has also accused the ISI of reinvigorating separatism and insurgencies in the country via support to pro-Khalistan militant groups such as the International Sikh Youth Federation (ISYF), in order to destabilize India. A report by India's Intelligence Bureau (IB) indicated that ISI was "desperately trying to revive Sikh" militant activity in India. The ISI is also allegedly active in printing and supplying counterfeit Indian rupee notes.

History

The ISI was created after the Indo-Pakistani War of 1947, due to the Military Intelligence of Pakistan's (MI) weak performance. When Zia-ul-Haq seized power in July 1977, he started his K2 (Kashmir and Khalistan) strategy, initiating Operation Tupac. He gave ISI the duty to make Jammu and Kashmir a part of Pakistan, and to send insurgents to Punjab. The intelligence agency's aims are to confound Indian Muslims using Kashmiri Muslims, extend the ISI network in India, cultivate insurgents and insurgent groups, cause attacks similar to the 1993 Bombay bombings in other cities, and create a state of insurgency in Muslim-dominated regions. The ISI has allegedly set up bases in Nepal and Bangladesh, which are used for operations in North-East India.

Operations in Jammu and Kashmir
About 24 million ruppes are paid out per month by the ISI, in order to fund its activities in Jammu and Kashmir. Pro-Pakistani groups were reportedly favored over other militant groups. Creation of six militant groups in Kashmir, which included Lashkar-e-Taiba (LeT), was aided by the ISI. According to American Intelligence officials, ISI is still providing protection and help to LeT. The Pakistan Army and ISI also LeT volunteers surreptitiously penetrate from Pakistan Administrated Kashmir to Jammu and Kashmir. As of 2010, the degree of control that ISI retains over LeT's operations is not known. The LeT was also reported to have been directed by the ISI to widen its network in the Jammu region where a considerable section of the populace comprised Punjabis.

Involvement in terrorist attacks

1993 Mumbai blasts
The 1993 Mumbai bombings were a series of 13 bomb explosions that took place in Bombay (now Mumbai), Maharashtra, India on Friday, 12 March 1993. The coordinated attacks were the most destructive bomb explosions in Indian history. The single-day attacks resulted in over 250 fatalities and 1,200 injuries.

The attacks were coordinated by Dawood Ibrahim, don of the Mumbai-based international organised crime syndicate named D-Company.

Ibrahim is believed to have ordered and helped organise the bombings in Mumbai, through one of his subordinates, Tiger Memon. The bombings are also believed to have been financially assisted by the expatriate Indian smugglers, Hajji Ahmed, Hajji Umar and Taufiq Jaliawala, as well as the Pakistani smugglers, Aslam Bhatti and Dawood Jatt. The Indian authorities have also alleged the involvement of the Inter-Services Intelligence (ISI) agency, in the blasts. On 16 June 2017 giving its verdict in the 1993 Mumbai bomb-blast case, a Special Terrorism and Disruptive Activities Act court pronounced gangster Mustafa Dossa and Firoz Khan guilty of conspiracy. The charges can draw the punishment of the death penalty. Accused Abu Salem also got convicted under charges of conspiracy and terror activities.

26/11 attacks
Zabiuddin Ansari, a Lashkar-e-Taiba militant accused for his involvement in the 2008 Mumbai attacks, said that ISI and Pakistani army officials were involved in planning the attacks and had attended the meetings. An Indian report, summarising intelligence gained from India's interrogation of David Headley, alleged that ISI had provided support for the attacks by providing funding for reconnaissance missions in Mumbai. The report included Headley's claim that Lashkar-e-Taiba's chief military commander, Zaki-ur-Rahman Lakhvi, had close ties to the ISI. He alleged that "every big action of LeT is done in close coordination with [the] ISI."

In 2012 Pakistani civilian security agencies told Pakistan courts that "suspects in the Mumbai attacks case got training at various centres of the banned Lashkar-e-Taiba (LeT) militant organisation, including navigational training in Karachi" & "suspects, who allegedly participated in the attacks, were trained at the LeT training centres at Yousaf Goth in Karachi, Buttle in Mansehra, Mirpur Sakro in Thatta and Muzaffarabad"

Mumbai train blasts
ISI was accused of planning the 2006 Mumbai train bombings and the Indian government said that the ISI, LeT and SIMI planned the attacks.

Counterfeit Indian rupee notes
The ISI has been printing counterfeit Indian rupee notes, which are believed to be printed in Muzaffarabad. In January 2000, the Nepal police raided Wasim Saboor's house, who was an official of the Pakistani embassy of Kathmandu. They found fifty thousand Indian rupee notes, each of ₹50 denomination.

See also
Inter-Services Intelligence activities in Afghanistan
Criticism of Pakistan
Islamic Jihad
Pakistan and state-sponsored terrorism

References

Notes

India
India–Pakistan relations
Intelligence operations
India
Activities of foreign intelligence agencies in India